A Palace Concert is a Chinese Tang Dynasty silk painting showing ten court ladies and two standing servant maidens around a large rectangular table. Some court ladies are depicted drinking tea, while others drink wine. The four women at the far end are presumably responsible for playing music and livening up the mood. The musical instruments depicted, from left to right, are bamboo pipes, guqin, pipa and bili. One of the servant maidens plays a clapper to maintain beat. A small dog is depicted under the table. The artist and the precise year of the painting are unknown. The painting is housed in the National Palace Museum in Taipei, Taiwan.

Dating
The hairstyles are combed in one direction on top, while others are combed in two directions and tied into knots around the ears. In addition to a floral headdress, these all indicate some of the popular Tang dynasty fashions. The woven bamboo table, cusped crescent stools, winged wine cups and the style of the lute playing with a large pick showcase late Tang dynasty customs.

References

External links
Entry at the National Palace Museum website

See also
Tang dynasty painting

Tang dynasty paintings
Portraits of women
National Palace Museum
Musical instruments in art
Dogs in art